Anatoli Nikolayevich Ivanov (born 25 May 1940) is a retired Russian football coach and a former player.

References

External links
 

1940 births
Living people
Soviet footballers
FC SKA Rostov-on-Don players
Soviet expatriate footballers
Expatriate footballers in East Germany
TSG Neustrelitz players
Soviet football managers
FC Baltika Kaliningrad managers
FC Sokol Saratov managers
Russian football managers
Association football goalkeepers